The Sabireen Movement, meaning the "Movement of the Patient Ones", is a Palestinian militant group. The group was formed in early 2014 after some leaders in Palestinian Islamic Jihad (PIJ) converted to Shia Islam and became dissatisfied with PIJ's leadership and their stance, as well as Hamas' stance regarding the Yemeni Civil War and Syrian Civil War, where it supported the Saudi-led intervention and anti-government groups, respectively.

History
Inspired by the Fathi Shaqaqi’s works on Islamic Revolution in 1979, the earliest form of the group can be traced back to 2010 as a reformist movement in Gaza calling for a revolution inspired by the Iranian Revolution. While Hamas supported the Syrian rebellion, the Sabireen Movement has praised Iran's involvement as well as Hezbollah's, the group has sent condolences to Hezbollah fighters killed in Syria as well as by Israeli airstrikes against Hezbollah, and has called on the residents of the Yarmouk Camp to fight ISIL's presence in the suburb. The group has also condemned the Saudi-led intervention in Yemen with Salim calling it "an attack on the Yemeni people".

After leaving Palestinian Islamic Jihad and converting to Shia Islam, Salim has called on his followers to do the same and convert and has also encouraged followers who have already become Shia to proselytize in the Gaza Strip. According to the State Department in September 2015 the group fired rockets into Israeli territory, and in January 2016 Salim announced the group had expanded into the West Bank by establishing cells there, the next month in response to the announcement the Palestinian Authority arrested five men in Bethlehem as part of a cell belonging to the group.

In 2015, Hamas called for the dissolution of the group with Hamas claiming “Sabireen's involvement was against the people of Gaza”, Hamas has also interrogated individuals affiliated with the Sabireen Movement. 

In early 2018 the Trump administration designated the group as a Specially Designated Global Terrorist Organization under an executive order. A Washington DC based think tank called The Washington Institute for Near East Policy asserted that the group's formation could be a bid by Iran to replace Hamas as a proxy with Sabireen given Hamas' stance on Syria and the religious divide between the two.

In 2019, Hamas arrested more than 70 Sabireen members and confiscated their weapons, effectively ending the existence of the organisation. The reasoning behind such move was that Hamas wanted to maintain peace with Israel, while Sabireen Movement refused any attempts at reconciliations.

In 2021, Tehran Times “alleged” that Hisham Salim was granted asylum in Iran, while ordinary members of the group joined Al-Quds Brigades and/or Iraqi Harakat Hezbollah al-Nujaba that operates charity in the Gaza Strip.

Ideology
Upon creation, the movement did not introduced itself as a Shiite  movement. Its secretary general says it does not represent a certain sect, stressing that sectarianism only serves the enemies' best interests. He also denies that the movement only consists of Shiites and does not accept Sunni members.

In January 2016, Hisham Salim, founder of the Harakat al-Sabireen, told the Palestinian Ma'an News Agency that the group, like Hezbollah, is directly funded by the Iranian government, but stressed that his group was non-sectarian, non-religious and certainly not a "Shiite movement."

References

Organizations established in 2014
National liberation movements
Jihadist groups in Palestine
Palestinian militant groups
Palestinian terrorism
Anti-Zionism in the Palestinian territories
Resistance movements
Shia Islamist groups
Axis of Resistance
Organizations designated as terrorist by Canada
Organizations designated as terrorist by the United States